1,3-Dihydroxyanthraquinone, also called purpuroxanthin or xanthopurpurin, is an organic compound with formula  that occurs in the plant Rubia cordifolia (Indian madder).  It is one of ten dihydroxyanthraquinone isomers.  Its molecular structure can be viewed as being derived from anthraquinone by replacement of two hydrogen atoms (H) by hydroxyl groups (-OH).

Xanthopurpurin occurs in small amounts (as a glycoside) in the root of the common madder plant, Rubia tinctorum, together with alizarin, purpurin and other anthraquinone derivatives.

Properties
Xanthopurpurin is insoluble in hexane but soluble in chloroform.  It can be obtained from solutions in the latter as reddish crystals that melt at 270–273 °C.

Like many dihydroxy- and trihydroxyanthraquinones, it has a purgative action, although only 1/6  as effective as 1,2,7-trihidroxyanthraquinone (anthrapurpurin).

See also
alizarin (1,2-dihydroxyanthraquinone)

References

Anthraquinone dyes
Dihydroxyanthraquinones
Resorcinols
3-Hydroxypropenals within hydroxyquinones